Barbonymus strigatus is a species of cyprinid fish endemic to the island of Borneo where it is only known to occur in the north, restricted to the state of Sabah. This species can reach a length of  TL.

References

strigatus
Taxa named by George Albert Boulenger
Fish described in 1894